The Transmitter Berlin-Tegel was a broadcasting facility for medium wave in Berlin-Tegel, Germany. It was built in 1933 and used as an aerial wire hung up in a  tower of wood framework. In 1940, the height of the tower was reduced to 86 metres. On December 16, 1948 the tower (and a guyed mast under construction, intended to replace the tower) was bombed under orders of the French Commander (Jean Ganeval) at the time, because of concerns of endangering the air traffic of the nearby Berlin Tegel Airport, which was under construction at the time.

The transmitters were moved to Königs Wusterhausen and installed there. Nevertheless, the transmitter building is still standing.

See also
 List of towers

References

External links
 
 http://www.skyscraperpage.com/diagrams/?b47059

Buildings and structures in Berlin